Mark Dudley (born 29 January 1990) is an English former professional footballer who played as a defender.

Career

Early career
Dudley was born in Doncaster, England. Following a loan spell at Conference North side Tamworth, where he played eight times as the club won the division,
Dudley made his debut for Derby County as an 84th minute sub for Stephen Pearson in a 3–1 defeat away to Watford on 3 May 2009.

For the 2009–10 season Dudley was given the squad number 33, but was not involved in first team duties, instead spending loan spells at Alfreton Town and Hinckley United. At the end of the 2009–10 season Derby announced that, along with several first team players such as Gary Teale and Jay McEveley, Dudley would be released at the end of their contracts in June 2010. Following the completion of his Derby contract he signed for League of Ireland Premier Division side St Patrick's Athletic, although he never played a game for the club.

Hinckley United
Dudley signed for Hinckley United in August 2011 following a loan spell the previous season. He signed on at Hinckley United for a second season, 2012–13, during the summer of 2012. He left the club within the first month of the 2012–13 season.

Brigg
Dudley played the remainder of the 2012–13 season for Brigg Town.

References

External links

1990 births
Living people
Footballers from Doncaster
English footballers
Association football fullbacks
Derby County F.C. players
Tamworth F.C. players
Alfreton Town F.C. players
Hinckley United F.C. players
St Patrick's Athletic F.C. players
English Football League players
League of Ireland players